The Aprilia Mojito is a scooter built by Aprilia, also known as the Aprilia Habana. Introduced in 2000. The design is very similar to the much older Honda Joker.

See also
 Honda Joker
 Znen C Artemis

External links
 aprilia.com

Motor scooters
Mojito
Motorcycles introduced in 2006